This is a list of the largest National Football League player trades in league history, in terms of the number of players and Draft picks exchanged. In the case of draft picks, names in parentheses indicate the player eventually selected with that pick.

Trades

18 players

On October 13, 1989, the Dallas Cowboys, Minnesota Vikings and San Diego Chargers were involved in an 18-player trade, the largest trade in NFL history.

15 players
The Baltimore Colts and Cleveland Browns swapped 15 players on March 26, 1953.

14 players
14 players moved between the Los Angeles Rams and Washington Redskins on January 28, 1971, the opening day of the 1971 NFL Draft.

12 players
The Dallas Texans and Los Angeles Rams traded 12 players on June 13, 1952. This was the largest trade by one team for a single player in history, as the Rams traded 11 players for one.

10 players
The Chicago Cardinals and Los Angeles Rams saw 10 players move on March 23, 1959. This was another "one-for-several" trade, as the Rams sent nine players to Chicago for just one.

On October 31, 1987, the Buffalo Bills, Indianapolis Colts and Los Angeles Rams traded 10 players between them.

See also

National Football League
NFL Draft

References
 
 
 2003 NFL Record & Fact Book, 84th Season (Official 2003 National Football League Record & Fact Book), 

Trades, largest
Sports trades
National Football League lists